Miss Gabon is a national beauty pageant in Gabon. The pageant was established in 2001 by Défis de femmes.

National franchises
Miss Gabon has become official national franchise of Miss Universe in Libreville since 2012. The winner automatically declares as Miss Universe Gabon and represent Gabon at the Miss Universe pageant. On occasion, when the winner does not qualify (due to age) for either contest, a runner-up is sent. The Miss Gabon is also selecting the titleholders to participate in the other Big Four international beauty pageants such as Miss World, Miss International, Miss Earth and other minor international pageants such as Miss Tourism World and Miss Supranational.

Titleholders
The following is a list of winners. From 2009 to 2015.

Big Four pageants representatives

Miss Universe Gabon

Miss Gabon has become official national franchise of Miss Universe in Libreville since 2012. The winner automatically declares as Miss Universe Gabon and represent Gabon at the Miss Universe pageant. On occasion, when the winner does not qualify (due to age) for either contest, a runner-up is sent.

Miss World Gabon

The 1st Runner-up of Miss Gabon will crown as Miss World Gabon and compete at Miss World.

Miss International Gabon

The Miss International Gabon is usually designated by Top candidates at Miss Gabon (Runner-up or sometimes winning contest).

Miss Earth Gabon

The 2nd Runner-up of Miss Gabon will crown as Miss Earth Gabon and compete at Miss Earth.

References

External links
 www.defisdefemmes.com

Beauty pageants in Gabon
Gabon
Gabon
Gabon
Gabon
Gabon
Gabonese awards